DXHY (106.3 FM), broadcasting as 106.3 Radyo Natin, is a radio station owned and operated by Manila Broadcasting Company through its licensee Cebu Broadcasting Company. Its studios and transmitter are located along 13-15th Sts. Brgy. Nazareth, Cagayan de Oro. It is one of the few Radyo Natin stations in major markets. However, it airs a news and talk format, similar to DZRH and Aksyon Radyo.

References

Radio stations in Cagayan de Oro
Radio stations established in 2007